Sholto may refer to:

People with the name
Sholto Kairakau Black (1902–1963), New Zealand teacher, principal, community services co-ordinator, community leader
Sholto Kynoch, English pianist
Basil William Sholto Mackenzie, 2nd Baron Amulree (1900–1983), British physician and leading advocate of geriatric medicine in the UK
Sholto Marcon (1890–1959), Church of England schoolmaster, clergyman and international field hockey player
Sholto Percy, pseudonym of Joseph Clinton Robertson (1787–1852), Scottish patent agent, writer and periodical editor
Sholto Taylor (born 1972), wheelchair rugby player, and a member of the national team, the Wheel Blacks

Fictional entities
Bartholomew and Thaddeus Sholto, characters in Arthur Conan Doyle's Sherlock Holmes novel, The Sign of the Four (1890)
 Sholto, character in Emily Rodda's The Three Doors

See also
Sholto Douglas (disambiguation)
Holo (disambiguation)
Holt (disambiguation)
Hoto (disambiguation)
Solo (disambiguation)
Soto (disambiguation)